Czwórka may refer to the following places in Poland:
Czwórka in Gmina Twardogóra, Oleśnica County in Lower Silesian Voivodeship (SW Poland)
Other places called Czwórka (listed in Polish Wikipedia)